Mae Tha is a district (amphoe) of Lamphun province, northern Thailand.

Etymology
The district is named after the Mae Tha River.

History
The minor district (king amphoe) Mae Tha was established in 1939, when it was split off from Mueang Lamphun district. It was upgraded to a full district on 22 July 1958.

Geography

Neighboring districts are (from the south clockwise): Thung Hua Chang, Ban Hong, Pa Sang and Mueang Lamphun of Lamphun Province, Mae On of Chiang Mai province, Mueang Lampang, Hang Chat and Soem Ngam of Lampang province.

The Khun Tan Range stretches from north to south along the district.

Administration
The district is divided into six sub-districts (tambons), which are further subdivided into 68 villages (mubans). There are two townships (thesaban tambons): Tha Sop Sao covers parts of tambon Tha Sop Sao, and Tha Kat parts of tambon Tha Kat and Tha Khum Ngoen. There are a further six tambon administrative organizations (TAO).

References

External links
amphoe.com (Thai)

Mae Tha